Vivaham Swargathil is a 1970 Indian Malayalam-language film,  directed by J. D. Thottan and produced by P. A. Muhammad Kasim. The film stars Prem Nazir, Sheela, Thikkurissy Sukumaran Nair and Prema. The film had musical score by M. S. Baburaj.

Cast

Prem Nazir
Sheela
Thikkurissy Sukumaran Nair
Prema
T. S. Muthaiah
Adoor Bhavani
Kaduvakulam Antony
K. S. Parvathy
Rani Chandra
T. K. Balachandran
Vijayanirmala

Soundtrack
The music was composed by M. S. Baburaj and the lyrics were written by Vayalar Ramavarma.

References

External links
 

1970 films
1970s Malayalam-language films
Films directed by J. D. Thottan
Films scored by M. S. Baburaj